These are the individual stages of the 2009 Vuelta a España, with Stage 12 on 11 September and Stage 21 on 20 September.

Stages
 s.t. indicates that the rider crossed the finish line in the same group as the one receiving the time above him, and was therefore credited with the same finishing time.

Stage 12
11 September 2009 — Almería to Alto de Velefique, 174 km

Coming out of the second rest day, the peloton gets a course with over 3,500 meters in total climbing. It includes two visits to the Alto de Velefique, one coming after 55 km and the other at the finish line. There is another first and a third-category climb on the day.

Stage 13
12 September 2009 — Berja to Sierra Nevada, 175 km

This is undoubtedly the queen stage of the 2009 Vuelta. The special-category Alto de Sierra Nevada at the finish is, at 2,520 metres, the highest point reached in the race. But it is far from all this course has to offer – the deceptively difficult and steep third-category Alto de Berja comes almost immediately and is followed by the first-category Puerto de la Ragua. The Vuelta has never before gone over the Puerto de la Ragua from this side, and it is more difficult than climbing it from the opposite side. Another first-category climb, the Alto de Monachil, occurs near the end of the stage, though it is essentially just the halfway point to the Alto de Sierra Nevada.

Stage 14
13 September 2009 — Granada to La Pandera, 157 km

The riders have one more high mountain stage to go through before making it back to flat lands. Two third-category climbs and several uncategorized rises precede another special-category summit stage finish at the Sierra de La Pandera.

Stage 15
14 September 2009 — Jaén to Córdoba, 168 km

This stage is branded as flat, though it begins at about 600 meters in elevation before descending to the valley below. It also includes the second-category Alto del Catorce por Ciento (which, despite its name, does not feature 14% gradients) 20 km from the finish.

Stage 16
15 September 2009 — Córdoba to Puertollano, 170 km

This is the easiest stage the peloton will have seen since Catalonia, with only two early third-category climbs to disrupt an otherwise flat overall profile.

Stage 17
16 September 2009 — Ciudad Real to Talavera de la Reina, 175 km

This stage was thought to be a hard-fought reward for whichever sprinters fought their way through the heights wrought by the Vuelta's second week – it did not feature a single categorized climb. It was expected to see a mass sprint finish. Contrary to expectations, 's Anthony Roux was able to hold off the chasing peloton to take the win by just a few meters.

Stage 18
17 September 2009 — Talavera de la Reina to Ávila, 175 km

This course has four categorized climbs, three of which are new to the Vuelta. The selection should take place on the first-category Puerto de Mijares, which comes at the halfway point of the stage.

Stage 19
18 September 2009 — Ávila to La Granja de San Ildefonso, 175 km

This is the Vuelta's last mountain stage. It includes two passes over the first-category Puerto de Navacerrada, the second of which crests 17 km from the finish. There is also quite a lot of descending to do on this stage, as the four categorized climbs all begin and end at roughly the same elevation. The finish comes on the descent from the last pass over the Puerto de Navacerrada.

Stage 20
19 September 2009 — Toledo, 26 km (ITT)

The course for the final time trial is flat, with very gentle undulation.

Stage 21
20 September 2009 — Rivas-Vaciamadrid to Madrid, 110 km

The Vuelta ended, by tradition, much like the Tour de France does, with a flat and largely ceremonial road stage. It ended in downtown Madrid at the Plaza de Cibeles.

References

See also

Stage 12 To Stage 21
Vuelta a España stages